Aleksei Viktorovich Chernavskii (or Chernavsky or Černavskii) (Алексей Викторович Чернавский, born January 17, 1938, in Moscow) is a Russian mathematician, specializing in differential geometry and topology.

Biography
Chernavskii completed undergraduate study at the Faculty of Mechanics and Mathematics of Moscow State University in 1959. He enrolled in graduate school at the Steklov Institute of Mathematics. In 1964 he defended his Candidate of Sciences (PhD) thesis, written under the under the guidance of Lyudmila Keldysh, on the topic Конечнократные отображения многообразий (Finite-fold mappings of manifolds). In 1970 he defended his Russian Doctor of Sciences (habilitation) thesis Гомеоморфизмы и топологические вложения многообразий (Homeomorphisms and topological embeddings of manifolds). In 1970 he was an Invited Speaker at the International Congress of Mathematicians in Nice.

Chernavskii worked as a senior researcher at the Steklov Institute until 1973 and from 1973 to 1980 at Yaroslavl State University. From 1980 to 1985 he was a senior researcher at the Moscow Institute of Physics and Technology.
Since 1985 he is employed the Kharkevich Institute for Information Transmission Problems of the Russian Academy of Sciences. Since 1993 he has been working part-time as a professor at the Department of Higher Geometry and Topology, Faculty of Mechanics and Mathematics, Moscow State University. He wrote a textbook on differential differential geometry for advanced students.

Chernavskii's theorem

Selected publications

References

External links
 

1938 births
Living people
Moscow State University alumni
20th-century Russian mathematicians
21st-century Russian mathematicians
Differential geometers
Topologists